Zhengding railway station is a station on Beijing–Guangzhou railway in Zhengding County, Shijiazhuang, Hebei.

History 
The station was opened in 1902.

Passenger services were suspended in 2011, and were resumed on 1 July 2015.

References 

Railway stations in Hebei
Stations on the Beijing–Guangzhou Railway
Railway stations in China opened in 1902